The Black Spot is a literary device invented by Robert Louis Stevenson for his novel Treasure Island (serialized 1881–82, published as a book in 1883).

In Treasure Island 
In the book, pirates are presented with a "black spot" to officially pronounce a verdict of guilt or judgment. It consists of a circular piece of paper or card, with one side blackened while the other side bears a message and is placed in the hand of the accused. It was a source of much fear because it meant the pirate was to be deposed as leader, by force if necessary—or else killed outright. In Treasure Island, Billy Bones is much frightened by it, yet remains determined to outwit his enemies; however, he suffers a stroke caused by the overconsumption of liquor and is killed by the blind beggar (Blind Pew). Later Long John Silver receives the spot, but is calm enough to notice that the paper bearing the spot has been torn out from a Bible, and warns his associates of the bad luck this will bring upon them.

The words on the back of that black spot were taken from the Biblical Book of Revelation, like an allusion to the mark of the beast and the last judgement, i.e. Chapter 29:

Origins
The origin of Stevenson's Black Spot might be in the historical tradition of Caribbean pirates of showing an ace of spades to a person condemned as traitor or informer. The card was putting the person dangerously "on the spot", as the ace bears a single pip.

Appearances in other works
The Black Spot has since been used in other works of popular culture:

Listed chronologically:
1930: In the novel Swallows and Amazons the pirate captain called Uncle Jim (James Turner, also known as Captain Flint) receives the Black Spot from Nancy, a member of his crew.
1938: In the film Algiers Regis draws the ace of spades when forced to cut the deck. Carlos calls this drawing of the black spot "very bad luck".
1946: In the novel Joy in the Morning by P. G. Wodehouse, Boko Fittleworth commiserates with Bertie Wooster on learning that Bertie, rather than Stilton Cheesewright, has become engaged to Florence Craye by saying, "I did think that the black spot had finally passed into Stilton's possession."
 1948: Shirley Jackson's short story "The Lottery" describes the use of the black spot to select the annual victim of ritual human sacrifice.
1964: In the short story "Lonelyache" by Harlan Ellison, the protagonist Paul has a recurring nightmare in which a different young, good-looking man comes to kill him or "tip him the black spot".
1969: In A Pirate Utopia the pirate lord, Olaf, is given the black spot by Leonard as he had tortured some people without permission.
1986: In Stephen King's novel It, the doomed "Negro nightclub" is named "The Black Spot".
1990: "The Black Spot" is mentioned by a convict at the end of an episode of "The Bill" (series 6, episode 71, "Where There's a Will".)
1996: In the movie Muppet Treasure Island, a retelling of Treasure Island, the black spot is drawn on a piece of paper and given to Billy Bones; when he explains that the black spot is "a pirate's death sentence" the Great Gonzo utters "Fabulous". It is also given to Long John Silver on a leaf from a Bible, but he escapes execution by scolding at his crew that they have defiled the holy book and will be severely punished for it before he gives his crew a second chance once he accepts their forgiveness.
2000: The 2000 video game Skies of Arcadia presented players with a black spot, a message from a bounty hunter that they would soon be hunted down and killed.
2002: Puzzle Pirates, an MMORPG created by Three Rings Design, uses the term "Black Spot" to refer to a temporary way to silence rude and disruptive players.
2006: In the Disney feature film Pirates of the Caribbean: Dead Man's Chest, Captain  Jack Sparrow is presented with a "Black Spot" by Davy Jones as a marker that the Kraken can track; in the film, the black spot appears as a large black boil-like swelling on the palm of his hand.
2006: In Asylums' adaptation of Treausre Island, Pirates of Treasure Island the Black Spot appear as did in the original novel.
2007: In the CBS reality television show Pirate Master, the black spot is given by the captain to the three contestants that he nominates to be voted off.
2008: On the indie-Americana band Murder By Death's fourth album Red of Tooth and Claw, there is a song titled "The Black Spot" in which the singer laments, "The black spot, I never thought I'd be the one givin' it to you."
2009: The pirate-themed power/folk metal band Alestorm featured the Black Spot in their song "Chronicles of Vengeance" on their second album Black Sails at Midnight.
2011: The third episode of Series 6 (Season 32) of Doctor Who, "The Curse of the Black Spot", takes place on a pirate ship, and the black spot appears on the palm of anyone who is sick or injured, causing a supernatural seductress known as The Siren to hunt them down.
2006–2011: Kate Beaton's Hark! A Vagrant:, on page 265, has a pirate receive a black spot from another pirate before he is shot for pointing out that the practice was invented by Stevenson. On page 281, in the strip 
2012: In the TV series 30 Rock, in Season 6 Episode 3, "Idiots Are People Three", Jack Donaghy hands Criss (Liz Lemon's new boyfriend) a black spot while telling Liz he is Officially Disapproving of Criss (with no "H" and two "S"). He later presents Criss with a gold star following his marriage to Liz Lemon.
2016: In the TV series Black Sails, Season 3 Episode 10, "Chapter XXVIII", Billy Bones uses a black spot to intimidate traitors in Nassau.
2016: The naval-themed Tempest expansion to the 4X video game Endless Legend introduces a mechanic which rewards the player for attacking the armies of an empire marked by a Black Spot.
2017: In the WIB Optimist Project Akshay Mathur the Black Spot is given to his team to indicate work to be done.
2018: The JT Music channel of Rooster Teeth released the Sea of Thieves themed rap Booty Bound that refers to a black spot being given to any pirate who fails to find the treasure being searched for.
2020: The Journey's End update for the video game Terraria adds an item called The Black Spot, which when used grants the player a rideable flying pirate ship mount.

Notes

References

Piracy in fiction
Treasure Island